The Tour de Cargèse is a ruined Genoese tower  located in the commune of Cargèse on the French island of Corsica. Only the base of the tower has survived.

The Tour de Cargèse was built between 1605 and 1606 under the direction of Giacomo della Piana. It was one of a series of coastal defences constructed by the Republic of Genoa between 1530 and 1620 to stem the attacks by Barbary pirates.

See also
List of Genoese towers in Corsica

References

Further reading
 Includes information on how to reach 90 towers and many photographs.

Towers in Corsica